Bassar Prefecture is one of the prefectures of Togo and is located in Kara Region in Togo. The cantons (or subdivisions) of Bassar include Bassar, Kabou, Bitchabé, Dimouri, Sanda-Kagbanda, Bangéli, Baghan, Sanda-Afowou, Manga, and Kalanga.

Towns and villages

Afoou, Akalede, Aketa, Akomomboua, Alidounpo, Apoeydoumpo, Atontebou, Badao, Baga, Bakari, Bakoule, Bakpaya, Bamandou, Bamoundo, Bandiadou, Bandjeli, Bangan, Bangbou, Banjena, Baouda, Baoulinse, Bapele, Bapure, Bassambo, Bassar, Bassassin, Bassoude, Baya, Bekando, Bekouleb, Bekouroube, Belemele, Benata, Beoaja, Bessarakpenbe, Bia, Biakpabe, Bidaibe, Bigabo, Bijobebe, Bijomanbe, Bikambombe, Bikoutikpandi, Bikpadiab, Bikpandib, Binadioub, Binadioube, Binako, Binanoualiba, Binaparba, Binatape, Bindiba, Bissibi, Bissokpabe, Bitankpan, Bitiakpa, Bittindam, Bokourobe, Bongboldo, Bongbon, Bongoulou, Borbogou, Boro, Borokpindo, Bouele, Bougab, Boukoukpanbe, Boukpassiba, Boulou, Bouman, Boundiale, Boundido, Boungbale, Bounkoulinki, Bounkouloum, Bounlare, Boussekou, Boussie, Boutado, Boutiatiale, Boutob, Bouzem, Chaboua, Chapouko, Chodouko, Daboute, Dakpetab, Demon, Dengbaza, Diab, Diabagbal, Diabirdo, Diabougou, Diadiaba, Diakpanion, Diampele, Dianbildo, Diangouyadou, Dianta, Dibaldi, Dibanjori, Dibeti, Didyoyeri, Dimouri, Diotaoul, Dioubo, Ditanpayabouri, Dolardo, Dondonne, Douande, Egbetab, Etiotia, Fono, Fougo, Gangan, Garimbomb, Garka, Gassema, Gbangbale, Guérin-Kouka, Haba, Iboundiou, Idambado, Ikokoueni, Ikpasse, Immoudo, Inare, Infalebou, Inkoukoumamne, Insadou, Insalabou, Insandiapo, Jimbiri, Jiunjiunde, Kabanda, Kabangbag, Kabikou, Kabou, Kada, Kadio, Kadjika, Kadogou, Kadoue, Kaka, Kakourou, Kakpale, Kaktapalessi, Kalanga, Kali, Kalia, Kamaama, Kampale, Kanboua, Kandiado, Kankounde, Katcha, Katchamba, Ketangbao, Kidjaboum, Kikpan, Kikpeou, Kiniakara, Kissaboui, Kissaboun, Kissachieou, Kiteou, Kitoman, Kojenade, Kolaboun, Konadiou, Konassi, Kossamossi, Kotateou, Kouangan, Kouboabo, Koubodohon, Koubongou, Koudaboubou, Koudyobe, Koudyobon, Koudyoman, Koudyopongpong, Koukoumboul, Koukpan, Koulamon, Koulation, Koulassi, Koulifiagou, Koumalo, Koumalou, Koumaye, Koumbiretou, Koundouta, Kouni, Kountoum, Koupassassi, Koussatieou, Koussatine, Koutanbado, Koutchicheou, Kouteo, Koutian, Koutiere, Koutobi, Kpale, Kpandia, Kpankpande, Kperea, Kpouembek, Labo, Ladiek, Lajoudoun, Langonde, Lanke, Laou, Latioubdo, Lekpande, Lele, Liagalbou, Liboungdial, Lidialabo, Lidyobilbou, Lidyomalbo, Lie, Ligbale, Ligbalebou, Loajoule, Loande, Louakban, Louholoubo, Mabo, Maboualabi, Makalea, Manando, Manka, Manniedo, Massejioun, Massipou, Meda, Meifogou, Mewindo, Moande, Mogbante, Moukpido, Nabib, Nabouab, Naboukor, Nabouni, Nabouri, Nafindioul, Nafou, Nagbidjabou, Nahile, Nakbako, Nakpate, Namab, Namandioure, Namanjo, Nambowedo, Namon, Namore, Nampoa, Nampoak, Nanaeni, Nandouta, Nangbani, Nanguele, Nanhal, Nanioumboul, Nanjere, Nankoul, Naoulema, Napateou, Napimbo, Napitik, Napoulou, Narbale, Nassibiki, Natako, Natchamba, Natchiboura, Natchikpil, Natchitipi, Nawako, Nawallo, Naware, Nayombo, Niadou, Niagbangbou, Niakambou, Niambi Kara, Niankale, Nianpandi, Niantoule, Niempenou, Nikpakpare, Nimbeolo, Niniando, Nintambada, Nintin, Nlaman, Nouhoulme, Ntchiado, Onbatedempo, Oubombo, Oukredo, Ounado, Oussalne, Ouyombo, Pabouale, Padioule, Pakando, Paktanga, Pamboa, Papoual, Passao, Patadou, Patalabo, Patieli, Payoubo, Pebadjibe, Pensaka, Pesside Koundoum, Petab, Pipidioule, Pirinio, Pitambade, Pokpon, Poutamele, Sadjale, Sakpale, Samba, Sandiado, Sanpa, Sanpale, Sansale, Sante-Bas, Sante-Haut, Sapone, Sapounoumbo, Sara, Sayagali, Segou, Seni, Sichalebe, Sitiboubou, Sondina, Tabale, Tabalo, Tabara, Takoundou, Takpapie, Tamabade, Taman, Tameme, Taniamboul, Taouleba, Tapoun, Tayaro, Tchapossi, Tchatchaminade, Tcheoka, Tchiale, Tchiorgo, Tchirkpambo, Tchitchoa, Tchotchopola, Tchoutchoubeni, Tekfate, Tema, Tiakasso, Tiakbal, Tiambilibi, Tiamou, Tibado, Tiepakdo, Tieressou, Tikakan, Tiore, Tioutiou, Tipakpane, Tipil, Tirka, Titiar, Toguen, Tounabopi, Wabounian, Wadande, Wadiado, Wagam, Wakade, Waman, Wande Nadoum, Wangbale, Wango, Wapambouni, Weripi, Yabido, Yachiboule, Yakassi, Yankassia, Yapoutando

References

 
Prefectures of Togo
Populated places in Kara Region